Xinli Station, is a station of Line 9 of the Tianjin Metro. It started operations on 28 March 2004.

References

Railway stations in Tianjin
Railway stations in China opened in 2004
Tianjin Metro stations